James Monroe (1758–1831) was a U.S. Senator from Virginia from 1790 to 1794.

Senator Monroe may also refer to:

James Monroe (congressman) (1821–1898), Ohio State Senate
Jeff Monroe (born 1956), South Dakota State Senate
Rod Monroe (born 1942), Oregon State Senate